Zbelsurd Glacier is the 2.25 km long and 1.6 km wide glacier on the west side of Brugmann Mountains on Liège Island in the Palmer Archipelago, Antarctica.  It is situated southwest of Sigmen Glacier and north-northeast of Pleystor Glacier, draining the northwest slopes of Pavlov Peak and the north slopes of Mishev Bluff, and flowing northwestwards into Bolbabria Cove.

The glacier is named after the Thracian god Zbelsurd.

Location
British mapping in 1978 and 1980.

See also
 List of glaciers in the Antarctic
 Glaciology

Maps
 British Antarctic Territory.  Scale 1:200000 topographic map.  DOS 610 Series, Sheet W 64 60.  Directorate of Overseas Surveys, UK, 1978.
 British Antarctic Territory.  Scale 1:200000 topographic map.  DOS 610 Series, Sheet W 64 62.  Directorate of Overseas Surveys, UK, 1980.
 Antarctic Digital Database (ADD). Scale 1:250000 topographic map of Antarctica. Scientific Committee on Antarctic Research (SCAR). Since 1993, regularly upgraded and updated.

References
 Bulgarian Antarctic Gazetteer. Antarctic Place-names Commission. (details in Bulgarian, basic data in English)
 Zbelsurd Glacie. SCAR Composite Antarctic Gazetteer

External links
 Zbelsurd Glacier. Copernix satellite image

Glaciers of the Palmer Archipelago
Bulgaria and the Antarctic
Liège Island